Amrit  is a 1986 Indian Hindi drama film starring Rajesh Khanna in the title role playing the character of Amritlal Sharma. The film was directed by Mohan Kumar immediately after  directing  Avtaar with Khanna in the title role and lyrics written by Anand Bakshi. This movie gave Rajesh Khanna his fourth BJFA Best Actor award in 1987. The film was critically acclaimed and received five stars in Bollywood Guide Collections. The film was remade in Telugu as Aatma Bandhuvulu.

Synopsis
Amrit (Rajesh Khanna) stays with his only son and meanwhile Kamla (Smita Patil) a widow stays with her only son at Kamal Niwas. But Kamla is treated as servant in her own house and the only person who loves her in the house is her granddaughter Sunita. Amrit has the habit of taking his grandson to the nearby garden when his grandson is free from studies. Amrit learns about Kamla's problems due to him meeting her coincidentally quite regularly in the garden. Amrit and Kamla meet up to develop a  good relationship. One fine day Kamla gets late to pick up her granddaughter Sunita  from the school, as the auto rickshaw she was travelling to reach school, meets with an accident. Amrit, meanwhile goes to pick up his grandson Rahul, learns of this and brings Sunita to her house. Amrit sees  Kamla being humiliated by her daughter-in-law when he goes to their house to nurse Kamla's injury. Amrit decides to donate some money to Brahmins on the occasion of his son's birthday but he does not have money and so asks his son to give him few bucks. Amrit and Kamla watch TV with Sunita and Rahul, upon this Amrit's son gets angry and humiliate them, his son throws him out of the house permanently. In the torrential rains, the hurt Amrit meets with the accident. Kamla, then with help of like minded people, admits Amrit in a hospital. The rest of the story is about how Amrit and Kamla decide to separate from their respective selfish children and spend the rest part of life together and how society perceives their togetherness.

Reception
The film had collections worth gross of 9.3 crores at the box office in 1986 in India. It received five stars in the Bollywood guide Collections. The movie was a super hit and celebrated silver jubilee at many centers.

Cast
Rajesh Khanna as Amritlal "Amrit" Sharma 
Smita Patil as Kamla Saxena
Aruna Irani as Hasina Banu Ali
Shafi Inamdar as Advocate Sharafat Ali
Pallavi Joshi as Sunita Saxena
Shashi Puri as Shrikant Saxena
Rajesh Puri as the brother-in-law of Virendra Saxena
Satish Shah as Ramcharan Yadav
Sujit Kumar as Doctor
Mukri as Kamru, Vegetable Vendor
Zarina Wahab as Savitri Sharma
Rishabh Shukla as Virendra Saxena
Anita Kanwar as Rekha Saxena 
Yunus Parvez as Judge
Mumtaz Begum as Mausi (uncredited)
Shivraj as Fakir (in the song "Duniya Mein Kitna Gham Hai")
Birbal as Chajuram, Dhaba owner

Music

References

External links 
 

1986 films
Indian drama films
1980s Hindi-language films
Films scored by Laxmikant–Pyarelal
Hindi films remade in other languages
1986 drama films
Hindi-language drama films
Films directed by Mohan Kumar